Gromwell may refer to plants in one of two closely related genera:
 Lithodora
 Lithospermum